Yincun is a town of Yuanshi County, in southwestern Hebei province, China, located more than  south of Shijiazhuang, the provincial capital. , it has 14 villages under its administration.

See also
List of township-level divisions of Hebei

References

Township-level divisions of Hebei